Clutier is a city in Tama County, Iowa, United States. The population was 213 at the 2020 census.

History
A post office called Clutier has been in operation since 1900. The city was named for B. F. Clutier.

Geography
Clutier is located at  (42.078780, -92.403243).

Demographics

2010 census
As of the census of 2010, there were 213 people, 95 households, and 49 families living in the city. The racial makeup of the city was 92.5% White, 0.5% Native American, 4.7% from other races, and 2.3% from two or more races. Hispanic or Latino of any race were 8.9% of the population.

There were 95 households, of which 29.5% had children under the age of 18 living with them, 37.9% were married couples living together, 6.3% had a female householder with no husband present, 7.4% had a male householder with no wife present, and 48.4% were non-families. 43.2% of all households were made up of individuals, and 23.1% had someone living alone who was 65 years of age or older. The average household size was 2.24 and the average family size was 3.10.

The median age in the city was 41.8 years. 27.7% of residents were under the age of 18; 5.2% were between the ages of 18 and 24; 22.6% were from 25 to 44; 25.4% were from 45 to 64; and 19.2% were 65 years of age or older. The gender makeup of the city was 47.4% male and 52.6% female.

2000 census
As of the census of 2000, there were 229 people, 109 households, and 58 families living in the city. The racial makeup of the city was 97.82% White, 1.75% Native American, and 0.44% from two or more races.

There were 109 households, out of which 22.0% had children under the age of 18 living with them, 49.5% were married couples living together, 3.7% had a female householder with no husband present, and 45.9% were non-families. 42.2% of all households were made up of individuals, and 23.9% had someone living alone who was 65 years of age or older. The average household size was 2.10 and the average family size was 2.92.

In the city, the population was spread out, with 21.0% under the age of 18, 3.5% from 18 to 24, 26.2% from 25 to 44, 17.9% from 45 to 64, and 31.4% who were 65 years of age or older. The median age was 44 years. For every 100 females, there were 87.7 males. For every 100 females age 18 and over, there were 84.7 males.

The median income for a household in the city was $27,344, and the median income for a family was $39,583. Males had a median income of $28,000 versus $24,375 for females. The per capita income for the city was $14,092. About 11.9% of families and 12.6% of the population were below the poverty line, including 16.4% of those under the age of eighteen and 7.0% of those 65 or over.

Education
Clutier is within the North Tama County Community School District.

References

External links 
 A History of Tama County, J. R. Caldwell, 1910

Cities in Iowa
Cities in Tama County, Iowa